The University of Granma (UDG) is a public university located in Bayamo, Cuba.

See also 

Education in Cuba
List of colleges and universities in Cuba
Bayamo
Granma Province

External links
  

Granma
Bayamo
Educational institutions established in 1976
1976 establishments in Cuba
Buildings and structures in Granma Province